Havoc is a first-person shooter video game developed and published by American studio Reality Bytes, Inc. for Windows and Macintosh in 1995.

Gameplay
Havoc is a game in which the territories of Earth are ruled by factions which conquer other lands.

Reception
Next Generation reviewed the PC version of the game, rating it four stars out of five, and stated that "With room for up to 16 players using either Macintosh, Windows 95, or both systems, Havoc could be one of the best titles available for pure multiplayer action."

Reviews
GameSpot - Sep 06, 1996
Mac Gamer (1995)

References

1995 video games
Classic Mac OS games
Dystopian video games
First-person shooters
Tank simulation video games
Video games developed in the United States
Video games set in the future
Windows games